Guy Breton  (born April 1, 1950 in Saint-Hyacinthe, Quebec) is a Canadian radiologist and academic administrator. From 2010 to 2020, he was rector of the Université de Montréal in Quebec, Canada.

Early life and education 
Breton received a Bachelor of Arts from the Séminaire de Saint-Hyacinthe, as well as a medical degree (M.D.) in 1974 from Université de Sherbrooke. After completing a residency in diagnostic radiology at McGill University, he complemented his training with a fellowship in neuroradiology at the Montreal Neurological Institute and Hospital.

Career 
In 1979, he joined the Department of Radiology, Radio-Oncology and Nuclear Medicine at the Université de Montréal, where he was promoted to full professor in 1994, and became head of the department in 1996. He has also served as president of the Association des radiologistes du Québec from 1987 to 1997, where he negotiated budgets on behalf of nearly 500 radiologist members.  In 2010, he was appointed as the rector of the Université de Montréal.

Honours 

In 2009, he was awarded the Albert Jutras Prize from the Association des radiologistes du Québec.

In 2014, Breton was named a Member of the Order of Canada and, in 2020, and officer of National Order of Quebec.

References

1950 births
Canadian radiologists
Academic staff of the Université de Montréal
People from Saint-Hyacinthe
Living people
Université de Sherbrooke alumni
Members of the Order of Canada